Cletus Seidu Dapilah (born 2 April 1980) is a Ghanaian politician and member of the National Democratic Congress. He is the member of parliament for the Jirapa Constituency in the Upper West Region

Early life and education 
Dapilah hails from Tizza-Nimbare. He holds a Bachelor of Business Administration

References 

1980 births
Living people
Ghanaian Muslims
People from Upper West Region
Ghanaian MPs 2021–2025
National Democratic Congress (Ghana) politicians